"What? What You Got?" was the second single from Little Man Tate. It entered the UK Singles Chart at number 40. The song was first played by Steve Lamacq on BBC 6 Music.

The front cover of the single features an image of Access All Areas pass to the Boardwalk venue in the band's hometown of Sheffield. The music video starred British actress Melissa Leigh.

Track listing

 "What? What You Got?"
 "Young Offenders"

References

2006 singles
Little Man Tate (band) songs
2006 songs